Dinoconda is an S&S – Sansei Technologies 4th Dimension roller coaster located at Dino Watertown in Jiangsu, China. It is one of only three regular 4D coasters in the world. It has a capacity of 24 riders per train.

References

Roller coasters in China
4th Dimension roller coasters